The 1999 Tashkent bombings occurred on 16 February when six car bombs exploded in Tashkent, the capital of Uzbekistan. The bombs exploded over the course of an hour and a half, and targeted multiple government buildings. It is possible that five of the explosions were a distraction from the sixth, which appeared to be an attempt to assassinate President Islam Karimov. 16 were killed, and over 120 injured.

Although the government blamed Islamic rebels – the Islamic Movement of Uzbekistan (IMU) – critics have cast doubt on this assessment.

Because of the tight media control in the country, the sequence of events of the attacks is not totally clear.

The attacks
According to the official version of the attacks, four to five men drove a car full of explosives up to the main entrance to the Cabinet of Ministers building a few minutes before Karimov was due to speak there. The attackers left the scene. A separate car explosion and gunfight occurred a few hundred meters away, distracting the guards. The attackers fled the scene.

Investigation

According to the Federal Security Service, the bombings utilized a mechanical mixture of aluminium powder and ammonia nitrate as the explosive. The terrorists have received instruction in training centers run by Khattab and Basayev in Chechnya.

Government response
Two hours after the explosion, President Karimov and the heads of the Uzbek security forces declared that Islamic militants were responsible. Many individuals were arrested, with estimates ranging from the hundreds to up to 5,000. Human rights groups have criticized the detentions as illegitimate. They have also accused the government of planting evidence and getting confessions through torture.

In January 2000, on the eve of the Muslim holiday of Ramadan, the government announced the execution of several of the alleged participants in the attacks.

The Uzbek government also accused Tajikistan of being complicit in the attacks, and temporarily closed its border with the country in response.

Possible perpetrators
Although the government has blamed the Islamic Movement of Uzbekistan (IMU), an Islamist terrorist organization, for the attacks, critics have doubted this. Some have cast blame on Russia, although others have called this unlikely. Another possibility is that forces in the majority-Muslim Tajikistan government were retaliating for Uzbek support for Tajik opposition groups. Tajik terrorist groups have been suggested as well, especially the United Tajik Opposition (UTO).

Others have even suggested that the government itself was responsible, or that competing "clans", whose share of power in the government had recently been cut, were behind the attacks. In particular it has been suggested that the National Security Service, allegedly controlled by the Tashkent clan, was involved.

Aftermath
Critics have said that the Karimov regime used the attacks as an excuse to crack down on religious and, to a lesser extent, secular dissent. The attacks also showed how vulnerable the country was to terrorism and instability. Jaslyk Prison was opened in 1999 to hold thousands arrested following the bombings.

References

Bibliography

Improvised explosive device bombings in 1999
Mass murder in 1999
February 1999 events in Asia
February 1999 crimes
Terrorist incidents in Uzbekistan
Car and truck bombings in Asia
Terrorist incidents in Asia in 1999
History of Tashkent
20th century in Tashkent
1999 in Uzbekistan
Islamic Movement of Uzbekistan
Murder in Uzbekistan
1999 crimes in Uzbekistan
1990s murders in Uzbekistan
1999 murders in Asia